Agama paragama, the false agama, is a species of lizard in the family Agamidae. It is a small lizard found in Nigeria, Cameroon, Mali, Central African Republic, Ghana, Burkina Faso, Benin, and Niger.

References

Agama (genus)
Reptiles described in 1968
Taxa named by Alice Georgie Cruickshank Grandison